Australian bilateral treaties on extradition and criminal matters are a set of Australian treaties concerning extradition, and cooperation in criminal matters.

List
The absence of an extradition treaty does not, in theory, prevent an arrest and/or extradition either to or from that country.

Albania

1928 – Extradition Treaty between the United Kingdom of Great Britain and Northern Ireland and the Albanian Republic
1928 – Exchange of Notes between the Government of the United Kingdom of Great Britain and Northern Ireland [and on behalf of Australia, New Zealand and South Africa] and the Government of Albania extending to Certain Mandated Territories the Extradition the Government of Albania extending to Certain Mandated Territories the Extradition Treaty of 22 July 1926

Argentina

1889 – Treaty between the United Kingdom of Great Britain and Ireland and the Argentine Republic for the Mutual Extradition of Fugitive Criminals (Buenos Aires, 22 May 1889)
1990 – Treaty on Extradition between the Government of Australia and the Government of the Republic of Argentina
1993 – Treaty between the Government of Australia and the Government of the Argentine Republic on Mutual Assistance in Criminal Matters

Austria

1873 – Treaty between the United Kingdom of Great Britain and Ireland and Austria-Hungary for the Mutual Surrender of Fugitive Criminals of 3 December 1873
1873 – Declaration amending Article XI of the Treaty between the United Kingdom of Great Britain and Ireland and Austria-Hungary for the Mutual Surrender of Fugitive Criminals of 3 December 1873
1902 – Declaration amending Article XI of the Treaty between the United Kingdom of Great Britain and Ireland and Austria-Hungary for the Mutual Surrender of Fugitive Criminals of 3 December 1873
1928 – Exchange of Notes between the Government of the United Kingdom of Great Britain and Northern Ireland (and on behalf of Australia, New Zealand and South Africa) and the Government of the Republic of Austria extending to Certain Mandated Territories the Treaty for the Mutual Surrender of Fugitive Criminals of 3 December 1873, as amended
1935 – Convention between the United Kingdom and Austria supplementary to the Treaty for the Mutual Surrender of Fugitive Criminals of 3 December 1873
1975 – Treaty between Australia and the Republic of Austria concerning Extradition
1987 – Protocol between Australia and the Republic of Austria amending the Treaty concerning Extradition of 29 March 1973
1990 – Treaty between Australia and the Republic of Austria on Mutual Assistance in Criminal Matters

Belgium

1876 – Treaty between the United Kingdom of Great Britain and Ireland and Belgium for the Mutual Surrender of Fugitive Criminals (Brussels, 20 May 1876)
1876 – Declaration between the United Kingdom of Great Britain and Ireland and Belgium amending Article I of the Treaty for the Mutual Surrender of Fugitive Criminals of 20 May 1876 (London, 21 April 1887)
1877 – Declaration between the United Kingdom of Great Britain and Ireland and Belgium extending to Certain Additional Crimes the Treaty for the Mutual Surrender of Fugitive Criminals of 20 May 1876 (London, 23 July 1877)
1902 – Treaty between the United Kingdom of Great Britain and Ireland and Belgium for the Mutual Surrender of Fugitive Criminals
1907 – Convention between the United Kingdom of Great Britain and Ireland and Belgium supplementing Article XIV of the Treaty for the Mutual Surrender of Fugitive Criminals
1911 – Convention between the United Kingdom of Great Britain and Ireland and Belgium amending Article VI of the Treaty for the Mutual Surrender of Fugitive Criminals of 29 October 1901
1928 – Exchange of Notes between the Government of the United Kingdom of Great Britain and Northern Ireland (and on behalf of Australia, New Zealand and South Africa) and the Government of Belgium extending to Certain Mandated Territories the Convention for the Mutual Surrender of Fugitive Criminals of 29 October 1901, as amended
1986 – Treaty on Extradition between Australia and the Kingdom of Belgium

Bolivia

1892 – Treaty between the United Kingdom of Great Britain and Ireland and the Republic of Bolivia for the Mutual Surrender of Fugitive Criminals (Lima, 22 February 1892)
1928 – Exchange of Notes between the Government of the United Kingdom of Great Britain and Northern Ireland (and on behalf of Australia, New Zealand and South Africa) and the Government of Bolivia extending to Certain Mandated Territories the Treaty for the Mutual Surrender of Fugitive Criminals of 22 February 1892

Brazil

1872 – Treaty between the United Kingdom of Great Britain and Ireland and Brazil for the Mutual Surrender of Fugitive Criminals, and Protocol (Rio de Janeiro, 13 November 1872)
1996 – Treaty on Extradition between Australia and the Federative Republic of Brazil

Canada

1990 – Treaty between the Government of Australia and the Government of Canada on Mutual Assistance in Criminal Matters

Chile

1897 – Treaty between the United Kingdom of Great Britain and Ireland and Chile for the Mutual Surrender of Fugitive Criminals (Santiago, 26 January 1897)
1928 – Exchange of Notes between the Government of the United Kingdom of Great Britain and Northern Ireland (and on behalf of Australia, New Zealand and South Africa) and the Government of Chile extending to Certain Mandated Territories the Treaty for the Mutual Surrender of Fugitive Criminals of 26 January 1897
1996 – Treaty on Extradition between Australia and the Republic of Chile

Colombia

1888 – Treaty between the United Kingdom of Great Britain and Ireland and Colombia for the Mutual Surrender of Fugitive Criminals (Bogota, 27 October 1888)
1930 – Convention between the United Kingdom of Great Britain and Northern Ireland [and on behalf of Australia, New Zealand and South Africa] and the Republic of Colombia, supplementary to the Treaty for the Mutual Surrender of Fugitive Criminals of 27 October 1888

Congo

1924 – Convention between the United Kingdom of Great Britain and Northern Ireland, and Belgium, extending to the Belgian Congo and certain British Protectorates the Convention [Treaty] for the Mutual Surrender of Fugitive Criminals

Cuba

1905 – Treaty between the United Kingdom of Great Britain and Ireland and Cuba for the Mutual Surrender of Fugitive Criminals
1931 – Convention between the United Kingdom of Great Britain and Northern Ireland [and on behalf of Australia, New Zealand and South Africa] and the Cuban Republic for the Extension to Certain Protectorates and Mandated Territories of the Treaty for the Mutual Surrender of Fugitive Criminals of 3 October 1904

Czechoslovakia

1927 – Treaty between the United Kingdom of Great Britain and Ireland and Czechoslovakia for the Extradition of Criminals
1927 – Protocol amending Article 12 of the Treaty for the Extradition of Criminals between the United Kingdom of Great Britain and Ireland and Czechoslovakia of 11 November 1924

Denmark

1873 – Treaty between the United Kingdom of Great Britain and Ireland and Denmark for the Mutual Surrender of Fugitive Criminals (Copenhagen, 31 March 1873)
1928 – Exchange of Notes between the Government of the United Kingdom of Great Britain and Northern Ireland (and on behalf of Australia, New Zealand and South Africa) and the Government of Denmark extending to Certain Mandated Territories the Treaty for the Mutual Surrender of Fugitive Criminals of 31 March 1873
1936 – Convention [between United Kingdom and Denmark] supplementary to the Treaty for the Mutual Surrender of Fugitive Criminals of 31 March 1873

Ecuador

1880 – Treaty between the United Kingdom of Great Britain and Ireland and the Republic of the Equator [Ecuador] for the Mutual Surrender of Fugitive Criminals (Quito, 20 September 1880)
1928 – Exchange of Notes between the Government of the United Kingdom of Great Britain and Northern Ireland (and on behalf of Australia, New Zealand and South Africa) and the Government of Ecuador extending to Certain Mandated Territories the Treaty for the Mutual Surrender of Fugitive Criminals of 20 September 1880
1937 – Supplementary Convention between Australia, New Zealand, South Africa and the United Kingdom, and Ecuador, to the Treaty for the Mutual Surrender of Fugitive Criminals of 20 September 1880
1997 – Treaty between the Government of Australia and the Government of the Republic of Ecuador on Mutual Assistance in Criminal Matters
1990 – Treaty on Extradition between the Government of Australia and the Government of the Republic of Ecuador

El Salvador

1881 – Treaty between the United Kingdom of Great Britain and Ireland and El Salvador for the Mutual Surrender of Fugitive Criminals (Paris, 23 June 1881)
1930 – Exchange of Notes between the Government of United Kingdom of Great Britain and Northern Ireland [and on behalf of the Government of Australia, New Zealand and South Africa] and the Government of Republic of Salvador extending to certain Mandated Territories the Treaty for the Mutual Surrender of Fugitive Criminals of 23 June 1881

Estonia

1927 – Extradition Convention between the United Kingdom of Great Britain, Ireland and Estonia.
1927 – Exchange of Notes between the Government of the United Kingdom of Great Britain and Ireland (and on behalf of Australia, New Zealand and South Africa) and the Government of Estonia extending to Certain Mandated Territories the Extradition Convention of 18 November 1925

Finland

1925 – Treaty between the United Kingdom of Great Britain and Ireland, and Finland, for the Extradition of Criminals
1985 – Treaty between Australia and Finland concerning Extradition
1987 – Protocol between Australia and Finland amending the Treaty concerning Extradition of 7 June 1984
1994 – Agreement between Australia and Finland on Mutual Assistance in Criminal Matters

France

1876 – Treaty between the United Kingdom of Great Britain and Ireland and France for the Mutual Surrender of Fugitive Criminals (Paris, 14 August 1876)
1889 – Arrangement between the Government of the United Kingdom of Great Britain and Ireland and the Government of France extending to Tunis the Provisions of the Treaty for the Mutual Surrender of Fugitive Criminals of 14 August 1876 (Paris, 31 December 1889)
1896 – Convention between the United Kingdom of Great Britain and Ireland and France amending Articles VII and IX of the Treaty for the Mutual Surrender of Fugitive Criminals of 14 August 1876 (Paris, 13 February 1896)
1989 – Treaty on Extradition between the Government of Australia and the Government of the Republic of France
1909 – Convention between the United Kingdom of Great Britain and Ireland and France modifying Article II of the Treaty for the Mutual Surrender of Fugitive Criminals of 14 August 1876
1909 – Agreement between the United Kingdom of Great Britain and Ireland and France applying to Tunis the Convention of 17 October 1908 modifying Article II of the Treaty for the Mutual Surrender of Fugitive Criminals of 14 August 1876
1994 – Treaty between the Government of Australia and the Government of the French Republic on Mutual Assistance in Criminal Matters

Germany

1872 – Treaty between the United Kingdom of Great Britain and Ireland and Germany for the Mutual Surrender of Fugitive Criminals (London, 14 May 1872)
1911 – Treaty between the United Kingdom of Great Britain and Ireland and Germany respecting Extradition between British and German Protectorates
1912 – Treaty between the United Kingdom of Great Britain and Ireland and Germany extending to certain British Protectorates the Treaty for the Mutual Surrender of Fugitive Criminals of 14 May 1872
1930 – Exchange of Notes constituting an Agreement between the Government of the United Kingdom of Great Britain and Northern Ireland [and on behalf of the Governments of Australia, New Zealand and South Africa] and the Government of Germany extending to certain Mandated Territories the Treaty for the Mutual Surrender of Fugitive Criminals of 14 May 1872
1990 – Treaty between Australia and the Federal Republic of Germany concerning Extradition

Greece

1912 – Treaty [between the United Kingdom of Great Britain and Ireland and the Kingdom of Greece] for the Mutual Surrender of Fugitive Criminals
1928 – Exchange of Notes between the Government of the United Kingdom of Great Britain and Northern Ireland (and on behalf of Australia, New Zealand and South Africa) and the Government of Greece extending to Certain Mandated Territories the Treaty for the Mutual Surrender of Fugitive Criminals of 24 September 1910
1991 – Treaty on Extradition between Australia and the Hellenic Republic

Guatemala

1885 – Treaty between the United Kingdom of Great Britain and Ireland and Guatemala for the Mutual Surrender of Fugitive Criminals (Guatemala, 4 July 1885)
1914 – Additional Protocol [amending Article 10 of] the Treaty for the Mutual Surrender of Fugitive Criminals between the United Kingdom of Great Britain and Ireland and Guatemala of 4 July 1885
1929 – Exchange of Notes between the Government of the United Kingdom of Great Britain and Northern Ireland [and on behalf of Australia, New Zealand and South Africa] and the Government of Guatemala extending to Certain Mandated Territories the Treaty for the Mutual Surrender of Fugitive Criminals of 4 July 1885, as amended

Haiti

1874 – Treaty between the United Kingdom of Great Britain and Ireland and Haiti for the Mutual Surrender of Fugitive Criminals (Port-au-Prince, 7 December 1874)
1928 – Exchange of Notes between the Government of the United Kingdom of Great Britain and Northern Ireland (and on behalf of Australia, New Zealand and South Africa) and the Government of Haiti extending to Certain Mandated Territories the Treaty for the Mutual Surrender of Fugitive Criminals of 7 December 1874

Hong Kong

1997 - Agreement for the Surrender of Accused and Convicted Persons between the Government of Australia and the Government of Hong Kong
1999 – Agreement between the Government of Australia and the Government of Hong Kong concerning Mutual Legal Assistance in Criminal Matters -
2008 - Protocol Between the Government of Australia and the Government of the Hong Kong Special Administrative Region of the People's Republic of China Amending the Agreement for the Surrender of Accused and Convicted Persons (Hong Kong, 19 March 2007)

Hungary

1873 – Treaty between the United Kingdom of Great Britain and Ireland and Austria-Hungary for the Mutual Surrender of Fugitive Criminals of 3 December 1873
1873 – Declaration amending Article XI of the Treaty between the United Kingdom of Great Britain and Ireland and Austria-Hungary for the Mutual Surrender of Fugitive Criminals of 3 December 1873
1902 – Declaration amending Article XI of the Treaty between the United Kingdom of Great Britain and Ireland and Austria-Hungary for the Mutual Surrender of Fugitive Criminals of 3 December 1873
1928 – Exchange of Notes between the Government of the United Kingdom of Great Britain and Northern Ireland (and on behalf of Australia, New Zealand and South Africa) and the Government of Hungary extending to Certain Mandated Territories the Treaty for the Mutual Surrender of Fugitive Criminals of 3 December 1873, as amended
1938 – Treaty between the United Kingdom and Hungary supplementary to the Treaty for the Mutual Surrender of Fugitive Criminals of 3 December 1873
1997 – Treaty between Australia and the Republic of Hungary on Mutual Assistance in Criminal Matters
1997 – Treaty on Extradition between Australia and the Republic of Hungary Mandated Territories the Treaty for the Mutual Surrender of Fugitive Criminals of 3 December 1873, as amended

Iceland

1939 – Supplementary Convention between the United Kingdom of Great Britain and Northern Ireland and Iceland amending the Extradition Treaty (between United Kingdom and Denmark) of 31 March 1873

Indonesia

1995 – Extradition Treaty between Australia and the Republic of Indonesia
1999 – Treaty between Australia and the Republic of Indonesia on Mutual Assistance in Criminal Matters -

Iraq

1934 – Extradition Treaty between the United Kingdom and Iraq

Israel

1976 – Treaty between Australia and the State of Israel concerning Extradition
1983 – Exchange of Notes constituting an Agreement between the Government of Australia and the Government of Israel regarding the Taking of Evidence in One Country for use in Criminal Proceedings in the Other Country
1995 – Treaty between the Government of Australia and the Government of the State of Israel on Mutual Legal Assistance in Criminal Matters

Ireland

1989 – Treaty on Extradition between Australia and Ireland

Italy

1873 – Treaty between the United Kingdom of Great Britain and Ireland and Italy for the Mutual Surrender of Fugitive Criminals (Rome, 5 February 1873)
1976 – Treaty of Extradition between Australia and the Republic of Italy
1990 – Treaty of Extradition between Australia and the Republic of Italy
1994 – Treaty on Mutual Assistance in Criminal Matters between Australia and the Republic of Italy

Latvia

1926 – Treaty between the United Kingdom of Great Britain and Ireland, and Latvia, for the Extradition of Fugitive Criminals
1926 – Exchange of Notes between the Government of the United Kingdom of Great Britain and Ireland (and on behalf of Australia, New Zealand and South Africa) and the Government of Latvia extending to Certain Mandated Territories the Treaty for the Extradition of Fugitive Criminals of 16 July 1924

Liberia

1892 – Treaty between the United Kingdom of Great Britain and Ireland and Liberia for the Mutual Surrender of Fugitive Criminals (London, 16 December 1892)
1928 – Exchange of Notes between the Government of the United Kingdom of Great Britain and Northern Ireland (and on behalf of Australia, New Zealand and South Africa) and the Government of Liberia extending to Certain Mandated Territories the Treaty for the Mutual Surrender of Fugitive Criminals of 16 December 1892

Lithuania

1928 – Extradition Treaty between the United Kingdom of Great Britain and Ireland and the Republic of Lithuania
1928 – Exchange of Notes between the Government of the United Kingdom of Great Britain and Northern Ireland (and on behalf of Australia, New Zealand and South Africa) and the Government of Lithuania extending to Certain Mandated Territories the provisions of the Extradition Treaty of 18 May 1926

Luxembourg

1880 – Treaty between the United Kingdom of Great Britain and Ireland and Luxembourg for the Mutual Surrender of Fugitive Criminals (Luxemburg, 24 November 1880)
1928 – Exchange of Notes between the Government of the United Kingdom of Great Britain and Northern Ireland (and on behalf of Australia, New Zealand and South Africa) and the Government of Luxemburg extending to Certain Mandated Territories the Treaty for the Mutual Surrender of Fugitive Criminals of 24 November 1880
1938 – Convention between Australia, New Zealand and the United Kingdom of Great Britain and Northern Ireland, and the Grand Duchy of Luxembourg, supplementary to the Treaty for the Mutual Surrender of Fugitive Criminals of 24 November 1880
1950 – Convention between the United Kingdom and Luxembourg amending the Treaty for the Mutual Surrender of Fugitive Criminals of 24 November 1880
1988 – Treaty on Extradition between Australia and the Grand Duchy of Luxembourg
1994 – Treaty between Australia and the Grand Duchy of Luxembourg on Mutual Assistance in Criminal Matters

Mexico

1886 – Treaty between the United Kingdom of Great Britain and Ireland and Mexico for the Mutual Surrender of Fugitive Criminals (Mexico, 7 September 1886)
1991 – Treaty on Extradition between Australia and the United Mexican States
1992 – Treaty between Australia and the United Mexican States on Mutual Legal Assistance in Criminal Matters

Monaco

1891 – Treaty between the United Kingdom of Great Britain and Ireland and Monaco for the Extradition of Criminals (Paris, 17 December 1891)
1931 – Convention between the United Kingdom of Great Britain and Northern Ireland, Australia, New Zealand and South Africa, and Monaco, for the Extension to Certain Protectorates and Mandated Territories of the Treaty for the Extradition of Criminals of 17 December 1891 (Paris, 27 November 1930)
1990 – Treaty on Extradition between the Government of Australia and the Government of His Serene Highness the Prince of Monaco

Netherlands

1898 – Treaty between the United Kingdom of Great Britain and Ireland and the Netherlands for the Mutual Surrender of Fugitive Criminals (London, 26 September 1898)
1928 – Exchange of Notes between the Government of the United Kingdom of Great Britain and Northern Ireland (and on behalf of Australia, New Zealand and South Africa) and the Government of the Netherlands extending to Certain Mandated Territories the Treaty for the Mutual Surrender of Fugitive Criminals of 26 September 1898
1988 – Treaty on Extradition between Australia and the Kingdom of the Netherlands
1991 – Treaty between Australia and the Kingdom of the Netherlands on Mutual Assistance in Criminal Matters

Nicaragua

1906 – Treaty between the United Kingdom of Great Britain and Ireland and Nicaragua for the Mutual Surrender of Fugitive Criminals
1928 – Exchange of Notes between the Government of the United Kingdom of Great Britain and Northern Ireland (and on behalf of Australia, New Zealand and South Africa) and the Government of Nicaragua extending to Certain Mandated Territories the Treaty for the Mutual Extradition of Fugitive Criminals of 19 April 1905

Norway

1873 – Treaty between the United Kingdom of Great Britain and Ireland, and Sweden and Norway, for the Mutual Surrender of Fugitive Criminals (Stockholm, 26 June 1873)
1929 – Supplementary Agreement between the United Kingdom and Norway to the Treaty for the Mutual Surrender of Fugitive Criminals of 26 June 1873
1929 – Exchange of Notes between the Government of the United Kingdom of Great Britain and Northern Ireland [and on behalf of Australia, New Zealand and South Africa] and the Government of Norway extending to Certain Mandated Territories the Treaty for the Mutual Surrender of Fugitive Criminals of 26 June 1873, as amended
1987 – Treaty between Australia and Norway concerning Extradition

Panama

1907 – Treaty between the United Kingdom of Great Britain and Ireland and Panama for the Mutual Surrender of Fugitive Criminals
1928 – Exchange of Notes between the Government of the United Kingdom of Great Britain and Northern Ireland (and on behalf of Australia, New Zealand and South Africa) and the Government of Panama extending to Certain Mandated Territories the Treaty for the Mutual Surrender of Fugitive Criminals of 25 August 1906

Paraguay

1911 – Treaty between the United Kingdom of Great Britain and Ireland and Paraguay for the Mutual Surrender of Fugitive Criminals
1928 – Exchange of Notes between the Government of the United Kingdom of Great Britain and Northern Ireland (and on behalf of Australia, New Zealand and South Africa) and the Government of Paraguay extending to Certain Mandad Territories the Treaty for the Mutual Surrender of Fugitive Criminals of 12 September 1908
1942 – Supplementary Convention between His Majesty in respect of the United Kingdom, the Commonwealth of Australia, New Zealand and the Union of South Africa and the President of Paraguay to the Treaty for the Mutual Surrender of Fugitive Criminals of 12 September 1908
1999 – Treaty on Extradition between Australia and the Republic of Paraguay -

Peru

1907 – Treaty between the United Kingdom of Great Britain and Ireland and Peru for the Mutual Surrender of Fugitive Criminals
1928 – Exchange of Notes between the Government of the United Kingdom of Great Britain and Northern Ireland (and on behalf of Australia, New Zealand and South Africa) and the Government of Peru extending to Certain Mandated Territories the Treaty for the Mutual Surrender of Fugitive Criminals of 26 January 1904

Philippines

1991 – Treaty on Extradition between Australia and the Republic of the Philippines
1993 – Treaty between Australia and the Republic of the Philippines on Mutual Assistance in Criminal Matters

Poland

1935 – Treaty between the United Kingdom of Great Britain and Northern Ireland and the Republic of Poland for the Surrender of Fugitive Criminals
1999 – Treaty between Australia and the Republic of Poland on Extradition -

Portugal

1892 – Treaty between the United Kingdom of Great Britain and Ireland and Portugal for the Mutual Surrender of Fugitive Criminals (Lisbon, 17 October 1892)
1933 – Convention between the United Kingdom of Great Britain and Northern Ireland, Australia, New Zealand, South Africa and India, and the Portuese Republic, Supplementary to the Treaty for the Mutual Surrender of Fugitive Criminals of 17 October 1892, and Exchange of Notes
1934 – Exchange of Notes between the United Kingdom (and on behalf of Australia and New Zealand) and Portugal extending to certain Mandated Territories the Treaty for the Mutual Surrender of Fugitive Criminals of 17 October 1892
1988 – Treaty on Extradition between Australia and the Republic of Portugal
1994 – Treaty between Australia and the Republic of Portugal on Mutual Assistance in Criminal Matters

Romania

1893 – Treaty between the United Kingdom of Great Britain and Ireland and Roumania for the Mutual Surrender of Fugitive Criminals (Bucharest, 21 March 1893)
1894 – Protocol between the United Kingdom of Great Britain and Ireland and Roumania explanatory of Article II.21 of the Treaty for the Mutual Surrender of Fugitive Criminals of 21 March 1893 (Bucharest, 13 March 1894)
1929 – Exchange of Notes constituting an Agreement between the Government of the United Kingdom of Great Britain and Northern Ireland [and on behalf of Australia, New Zealand and South Africa] and the Government of Roumania extending to Certain Mandated Territories the Treaty for the Mutual Surrender of Fugitive Criminals of 21 March 1893, as amended

San Marino

1899 – Treaty between the United Kingdom of Great Britain and Ireland and San Marino for the Mutual Extradition of Fugitive Criminals (Florence, 16 October 1899)
1934 – Exchange of Notes between United Kingdom (and on behalf of Australia, New Zealand and South Africa) and San Marino extending to certain Mandated Territories of the Treaty for the Mutual Extradition of Fugitive Criminals

South Korea

1991 – Treaty on Extradition between Australia and the Republic of Korea
1993 – Treaty between Australia and the Republic of Korea on Mutual Assistance in Criminal Matters

Spain

1878 – Treaty between the United Kingdom of Great Britain and Ireland and Spain for the Mutual Surrender of Fugitive Criminals (London, 4 June 1878)
1889 – Declaration between the United Kingdom of Great Britain and Ireland and Spain amending Articles 2.5 and 6 of the Treaty for the Mutual Surrender of Fugitive Criminals of 4 June 1878 (Madrid, 19 February 1889)
1928 – Exchange of Notes between the Government of the United Kingdom of Great Britain and Northern Ireland (and on behalf of Australia, New Zealand and South Africa) and the Government of Spain extending to Certain Mandated Territories the Treaty for the Mutual Surrender of Fugitive Criminals of 4 June 1878, as amended
1988 – Treaty on Extradition between Australia and Spain
1991 – Treaty on Mutual Assistance in Criminal Matters between Australia and the Kingdom of Spain

Sweden

1873 – Treaty between the United Kingdom of Great Britain and Ireland, and Sweden and Norway, for the Mutual Surrender of Fugitive Criminals (Stockholm, 26 June 1873)
1907 – Supplementary Agreement between the United Kingdom of Great Britain and Ireland and Sweden to the Treaty for the Mutual Surrender of Fugitive Criminals of 26 June 1873
1974 – Treaty between Australia and Sweden concerning Extradition
1985 – Protocol between Australia and Sweden amending the Treaty concerning Extradition of 20 March 1973
1989 – Protocol between Australia and Sweden further amending the Treaty concerning Extradition of 20 March 1973

Switzerland

1880 – Treaty between the United Kingdom of Great Britain and Ireland and Switzerland for the Mutual Surrender of Fugitive Criminals (Berne, 26 November 1880)
1905 – Convention between the United Kingdom of Great Britain and Ireland and Switzerland supplementing Article XVIII of the Treaty for the Mutual Surrender of Fugitive Criminals of 26 November 1880
1929 – Exchange of Notes between the Government of the United Kingdom of Great Britain and Northern Ireland [and on behalf of Australia, New Zealand and South Africa] and the Government of Switzerland extending to Certain Mandated Territories the Treaty for the Mutual Surrender of Fugitive Criminals of 26 November 1880, as amended
1936 – Convention between the United Kingdom and Switzerland Supplementary to the Treaty for the Mutual Surrender of Fugitive Criminals of 26 November 1880
1991 – Treaty between Australia and Switzerland on Extradition
1994 – Treaty between Australia and Switzerland on Mutual Assistance in Criminal Matters

Thailand

1911 – Treaty between the United Kingdom of Great Britain and Ireland and Siam (Thailand) respecting the Extradition of Fugitive Criminals
1928 – Exchange of Notes between the Government of the United Kingdom of Great Britain and Northern Ireland (and on behalf of Australia, New Zealand and South Africa) and the Government of Siam extending to Certain Mandated Territories the Treaty for the Mutual Surrender of Fugitive Criminals of 4 March 1911

Uruguay

1884 – Treaty between the United Kingdom of Great Britain and Ireland and Uruguay for the Mutual Surrender of Fugitive Criminals (Montevideo, 26 March 1884)
1891 – Protocol between the United Kingdom of Great Britain and Ireland and Uruguay to amend Article IX of the Treaty for the Mutual Surrender of Fugitive Criminals of 26 March 1884 (Montevideo, 20 March 1891)

United States

1842 – Treaty between the United Kingdom of Great Britain and Ireland and the United States of America to Settle and Define the Boundaries between the Possessions of Her Britannic Majesty in North America and the Territories of the United States; for the Final Suppression of the African Slave Trade; and for the Giving up of Criminal Fugitives from Justice in certain cases [Webster-Ashburton Treaty] (Washington, 9 August 1842)
1889 – Supplementary Convention [to the Treaty of 9 August 1842] for the Extradition of Criminals (Washington, 12 July 1889)
1900 – Supplementary Convention between the United Kingdom of Great Britain and Ireland and the United States of America to the Convention for the Mutual Extradition of Criminals of 12 July 1889 (Washington, 13 December 1900)
1907 – Supplementary Convention between the United Kingdom of Great Britain and Ireland and the United States of America to the Convention for the Mutual Extradition of Fugitive Criminals of 12 July 1889, as supplemented
1935 – Extradition Treaty between the United Kingdom of Great Britain and Northern Ireland and the United States of America
1976 – Treaty on Extradition between Australia and the United States of America
1992 – Protocol amending the Treaty on Extradition between Australia and the United States of America of 14 May 1974
1999 – Treaty between the Government of Australia and the Government of the United States of America on Mutual Assistance in Criminal Matters, and Exchange of Notes

Venezuela

1993 – Treaty on Extradition between Australia and the Republic of Venezuela

Vietnam
2009 - Agreement Between Australia and the Socialist Republic of Vietnam concerning Transfer of Sentenced Persons (Canberra, 13 October 2008)

Yugoslavia

1900 – Treaty between the United Kingdom of Great Britain and Ireland and Serbia (Yugoslavia) for the Mutual Extradition of Fugitive Criminals (Belgrade, 6 December 1900)
1928 – Exchange of Notes between the Government of the United Kingdom of Great Britain and Northern Ireland (and on behalf of Australia, New Zealand and South Africa) and the Government of the Serb-Croat-Slovene State [Yugoslavia] extending to Certain Mandated Territories the Treaty for the Mutual Extradition of Fugitive Criminals of 6 December 1900

References

Extradition in Australia
Extradition treaties
Australian crime-related lists